Boophis jaegeri, also called the green skeleton frog, is a species of frog in the family Mantellidae.
It is endemic to Madagascar.
Its natural habitats are subtropical or tropical moist lowland forests, rivers, plantations, and heavily degraded former forest.
It is threatened by habitat loss.

References

External links
Boophis jaegeri Amphibiaweb:  Information on amphibian biology and conservation.

jaegeri
Endemic frogs of Madagascar
Amphibians described in 1992
Taxonomy articles created by Polbot